The Sikorsky S-434 is a light, turbine-powered helicopter. The S-434 is an improved development of the Schweizer S333.

Design and development
The prototype S-434 first flew on 18 December 2008 at Horseheads, New York. The S-434 evolved from the S-333, and has many features developed for the MQ-8 Fire Scout. It shares its cockpit layout with the S-333, which gives the crew very good visual capacities and handling characteristics.

On June 15, 2009, Sikorsky announced the delivery of the first two S-434s to Saudi Arabia's Ministry of the Interior, the first of a total of nine.

Variants
S-434  based on improvements developed for the MQ-8B; powered by one Rolls-Royce 250-C20W turboshaft engine of 320 shp.

Operators

 Ministry of the Interior

Specifications (S-434)

See also

References

External links

2000s United States helicopters
2000s United States civil utility aircraft
S-434
Single-turbine helicopters
Aircraft first flown in 2008